Chloe Rose (born October 25, 1994) is a Canadian actress. She rose to prominence when she portrayed Katie Matlin in the long-running teen drama television series Degrassi: The Next Generation, from 2011 to 2013. Following her time on Degrassi, Rose starred in the web series Teenagers (2014–2017), earning several award nominations for her performance as the lead protagonist, Bree. Rose has also starred in feature films such as Anita Doron's The Lesser Blessed (2012), Bruce McDonald's Hellions (2015), and Adam MacDonald's Pyewacket (2017).

Early life 
Rose was born and raised in Toronto, Ontario. She grew up in the same neighbourhood as award-winning Canadian film director Bruce McDonald, with whom she would later work with on Hellions (2015). As a teenager, she babysat his children. Rose attended high school at the Etobicoke School of the Arts alongside fellow Degrassi star Aislinn Paul.

Career 
Rose first attracted attention for her portrayal of Katie Matlin in the long-running teen drama television series Degrassi: The Next Generation. She was cast in 2010, with no previous acting experience; she left when her character graduated in 2013, after three seasons. Following her departure from Degrassi, Rose went on to play a variety of guest roles in several television series, including Rookie Blue (2012–2014), Lost Girl (2013), Killjoys (2015), and Dark Matter (2015).

In addition to her work in television, Rose has starred in a string of independent films. Her first film role was as Juliet Hope in The Lesser Blessed, directed by Anita Doron, which premiered at the 2012 Toronto International Film Festival. In 2014, she starred alongside Erin Sanders in the made-for-television film Guilty at 17. Later that year, she played a supporting role in the science-fiction film Bang Bang Baby, which premiered at the 2014 Toronto International Film Festival.

In 2015, Rose played the lead role in the Bruce McDonald-directed horror film Hellions (2015), alongside Luke Bilyk and Robert Patrick, which premiered at the 2015 Sundance Film Festival. During the 2015 Toronto International Film Festival, where Hellions also screened, IndieWire named Rose as one of the "9 Up-and-Coming Actors to Watch For". Hellions received mixed reviews from critics. That year, she was also part of the ensemble cast in the film People Hold On, directed by Michael Seater.

In 2016, Rose was featured in several productions, including 5 Films About Technology, a short film by Peter Huang, which screened at the 2016 Sundance Film Festival and 2016 Toronto International Film Festival, the drama film Unless, alongside Catherine Keener, which also premiered at the 2016 Toronto International Film Festival.

In 2017, Rose starred in the short film Clownface opposite her Rookie Blue co-star Matt Gordon; the film was released online through Vimeo, where it was chosen as a staff pick. Also in 2017, Rose returned as Katie Matlin on Degrassi: Next Class, for two episodes, and played a supporting role in the horror-thriller film Pyewacket, alongside Laurie Holden and Nicole Muñoz, which premiered at the 2017 Toronto International Film Festival.

From 2014 to 2017, Rose starred as the central protagonist, Bree, in the web series Teenagers. Rose has received considerable acclaim for her performance in the series, earning award nominations from the International Academy of Web Television, the Los Angeles Web Series Festival, the Indie Series Awards, and the Vancouver Web Series Festival. The third and final season premiered on YouTube on November 5, 2017. For her work in the third season of Teenagers, Rose earned a second nomination from the International Academy of Web Television at the 5th annual IAWTV Awards, but ultimately lost to High Life's Odessa Young. In 2018, she received a second nomination for Best Actress at the Vancouver Web Series Festival.

Filmography

Film

Television

Web series

Accolades

References

External links 

1994 births
Living people
21st-century Canadian actresses
Actresses from Toronto
Canadian child actresses
Canadian film actresses
Canadian television actresses